The 1995 World Table Tennis Championships – Corbillon Cup (women's team) was the 36th edition of the women's team championship.

China won the gold medal defeating South Korea in the final 3–0. Hong Kong won the bronze medal.

Medalists

Final stage knockout phase

Quarter finals

Semifinals

Third-place playoff

Final

See also
List of World Table Tennis Championships medalists

References

-
1995 in women's table tennis
Tab